Mervyn Stanley Agars (12 June 1925 – 8 August 2017) was an Australian rules footballer and journalist. He played with West Adelaide in the South Australian National Football League (SANFL). An eight-time state representative, he went on to have a significant career in sports journalism and in 2002 was inducted into the South Australian Football Hall of Fame. In 2018, Merv Agars was inducted into the SA Media Awards Hall of Fame.

Biography

Early life
Born to John and Margaret, on a sheep farm close to Elliston, South Australia, Agars grew up as one of 10 siblings, with seven brothers and two sisters.

Aged 13 he began boarding at Prince Alfred College in Adelaide and studied there for three years before returning to the family farm.

Towards the end of the war he served in the Air force reserve.

Career
Agars, a follower, began playing for West Adelaide in 1946 and in his second year of senior football was a member of their 1947 premiership team. He also played cricket for East Torrens and scored a century on A Grade debut in 1947.

In 1948 he joined The Advertiser and worked in the printing office, while he continued to play football, for both West Adelaide and the state. He married his wife Margaret, who is the sister of state cricketer Phil Ridings, in a ceremony at an Anglican church in Adelaide in 1949. He topped the goalkicking at West Adelaide in 1951, his penultimate season.

Retired from football, Agars transferred to the editing section of The Advertiser in 1953 and began work as a sports journalist. He later became sports editor, a position he held for close to 20 years, the longest serving in the newspaper's history.

During his journalism career he covered four Summer Olympics. He is the author of the book West Adelaide Football Club, Bloods, Sweat and Tears, a history of the club which was published in 1987.

The Advertiser annually award the "Merv Agars Medal" for the best player from the AFL's two South Australian clubs.

Personal life
One of his West Adelaide teammates, Don Taylor, was his brother-in law and a nephew, Leon Lovegrove, played in the club's 1961 premiership team.

His son, Graeme Agars, is a noted golf and tennis commentator.

Agars retired and resided in the Barossa Valley until his death in 2017.

References

External links

1925 births
2017 deaths
Australian rules footballers from South Australia
West Adelaide Football Club players
South Australian Football Hall of Fame inductees
Australian sports journalists
Australian newspaper editors
Journalists from South Australia